Temple Tower is a 1930 American pre-Code crime film directed by Donald Gallaher and starring Kenneth MacKenna, Marceline Day. and Peter Gawthorne.

The film depicts the character of Bulldog Drummond, a British adventurer and is based on the 1929 novel Temple Tower by Herman Cyril McNeile. It is sandwiched between more celebrated portrayals of the character by Ronald Colman in two United Artists films Bulldog Drummond and Bulldog Drummond Strikes Back.

Although described as lost, the film still survives, with copies held in the UCLA Archives.

Cast
 Kenneth MacKenna as Bulldog Drummond
 Marceline Day as Patricia Verney
 Henry B. Walthall as Blackton
 Cyril Chadwick as Peter Darrell
 Peter Gawthorne as Marrhews
 Ivan Linow as Gaspard
 Frank Lanning as The Nightingale
 Yorke Sherwood as Constable Muggins

References

Bibliography
 Backer. Ron. Mystery Movie Series of 1930s Hollywood. McFarland, 2012.

External links
 
 
 
 

Films based on Bulldog Drummond
1930 films
1930 crime films
American crime films
American black-and-white films
Fox Film films
Films based on British novels
Films set in England
1930s English-language films
Films directed by Donald Gallaher
1930s American films